Thomas or Tom Barrett may refer to:

Sports
Tom Barrett (baseball) (born 1960), former baseball player
Tom Barrett (footballer) (1934–2014), English footballer
Tom Barrett (ice hockey) (died 1996), Canadian ice hockey coach
Tom Barrett (riding mechanic) (1891–1924), motor-racing riding-mechanic

Others
Tom Barrett (Michigan politician) (born 1981), member of the Michigan House of Representatives and Michigan Senate
Tom Barrett (Wisconsin politician) (born 1953), U.S. Ambassador to Luxembourg and former mayor of Milwaukee, Wisconsin
Thomas Barrett, several baronets of the Barrett-Lennard baronets
Thomas Barrett (bishop) (died c. 1485), Irish bishop of Annaghdown
Thomas Barrett (convict) (c. 1758–1788), creator of the Charlotte Medal and the first person executed in the colony of New South Wales, Australia
Thomas J. Barrett (born 1947), American Coast Guard admiral and U.S. Deputy Secretary of Transportation
Tomás Bairéad (anglicised: Thomas Barrett; 1893–1973), Irish author and nationalist
Leslie Stuart (born Thomas Barrett; 1863–1928), English composer
T. L. Barrett (born 1944), American minister and gospel musician
T. W. Barrett (1851–1935), English music hall comedian and singer

See also
Thomas Barratt (disambiguation)
Thomas Barritt (1743–1820), British antiquary
Thomas Baret, English MP